Jamie Lorraine Mitchell (born January 31, 1985) is an American professional boxer who has held the WBA female bantamweight title since 2021.

Early life
Mitchell grew up in foster care and spent time in various juvenile detention facilities. As a teenager she spent time at Shiloh Treatment Center in Texas. While at the facility, Mitchell got into a fight and broke another girl's jaw. When asked by one of the facility's owners what they could do to help, Mitchell said she wanted to become a boxer. The owner, who later became her coach, also owned a boxing gym in Houston and agreed to send her there for training. Mitchell said of her first day in the gym, "they threw me in with this girl and she was like super tall and way older than me, she was like 32. I thought she was beating me up really bad, but they called me 'Mike Tyson's daughter' and from that point on I just kept coming back, I was just being relentless about it. I just loved it. That was my way into the game."

Professional career
Mitchell made her professional debut on January 21, 2017, scoring a four-round unanimous decision (UD) victory against Dalia Gomez at the Alameda County Fairgrounds in Pleasanton, California.

After compiling a record of 6–0–2 (4 KOs), Mitchell faced Shannon Courtenay for the WBA female bantamweight title on October 9, 2021 at the Echo Arena in Liverpool, England. The bout was set to serve as Courtenay's first defense of the WBA title she won in April, however, she was stripped of the title 24 hours before the bout after failing to weigh within the bantamweight limit, meaning only Mitchell would be eligible to win the now vacant title. Mitchell defeated Courtenay via majority decision (MD) over ten rounds, with two judges scoring the bout 97–93 and 96–94 in favour of Mitchell while the third judge scored it a draw at 95–95.

The first defense of her title came against Carly Skelly on February 5, 2022 at the Footprint Center in Phoenix, Arizona. After scoring knockdowns in rounds one and two, Mitchell threw a combination of punches in the fourth round that prompted the referee to call a halt to the contest, handing Mitchell a fourth-round knockout (KO) victory.

Professional boxing record

References

External links

Living people
1985 births
American women boxers
Boxers from Los Angeles
World bantamweight boxing champions
World Boxing Association champions